The 2017 Big East Conference baseball tournament was held at TD Ameritrade Park in Omaha, Nebraska, from May 25 through 28, 2017. The event, held at the end of the conference regular season, determined the champion of the Big East Conference for the 2017 season.  The winner of the double-elimination tournament received the conference's automatic bid to the 2017 NCAA Division I baseball tournament.

Format and seeding
The tournament used a double-elimination format and feature the top four finishers of the Big East's seven teams.

Bracket

References

Tournament
Big East Conference Baseball Tournament
Big East Conference baseball tournament
Big East Conference baseball tournament
College baseball tournaments in Nebraska
Baseball competitions in Omaha, Nebraska